Dan Hitchens (born 1989) is an English journalist and former editor of the Catholic Herald.

Biography
Educated at Cambridge University and Oxford University, he is the son of journalist and commentator Peter Hitchens and nephew of Christopher Hitchens.

Hitchens contributes to multiple publications, including The Spectator, First Things, National Review, The Critic and UnHerd.

References

External links

1989 births
Living people
English male journalists
English newspaper editors
English religious writers
English male non-fiction writers
Religion journalists